Rastatt is a town with a Baroque core, District of Rastatt, Baden-Württemberg, Germany. Rastatt was an important place of the War of the Spanish Succession (Treaty of Rastatt) and the Revolutions of 1848 in the German states.

History

Until the end of the 17th century, Rastatt held little influence, but after its destruction by the French in 1689, it was rebuilt on a larger scale by Louis William, Margrave of Baden, the Imperial General in the Great Turkish War known popularly as Türkenlouis.

It then remained the residence of the Margraves of Baden-Baden until 1771. It was the location of the First and Second Congress of Rastatt, the former giving rise to the Treaty of Rastatt while the second ended in failure in 1799. In the 1840s, Rastatt was surrounded by fortifications to form the Fortress of Rastatt. For about 20 years previous to 1866, it was occupied by the troops of the German Confederation.

The Baden revolution of 1849 began with a mutiny of soldiers at Rastatt in May 1849 under Ludwik Mieroslawski and Gustav Struve, and ended there a few weeks later with the capture of the town by the Prussians. (See The Revolutions of 1848 in the German states and History of Baden.) For some years, Rastatt was one of the strongest fortresses of the German empire, but its fortifications were dismantled in 1890.

In the same year, the town's railway station was relocated closer to the centre of Rastatt, from a location formerly outside the town walls, in what is now an industrial area.

Between 1946 and 1954, about twenty major criminal proceedings (known as the Rastatt Trials) for crimes against foreign workers and prisoners in smaller camps in the National Socialist camp system in south-west Germany took place in front of the French Military Administration's Tribunal Général on the basis of Control Council Law No. 10, along with more than 2000 defendants.

In 1992, a new Mercedes-Benz car factory started production in Rastatt.

Local attractions
Rastatt and the surrounding area is home to a variety of historical buildings, includes palaces and castles such as Schloss Rastatt and Schloss Favorite. It lies in the vicinity of the Black Forest and the French border.

Twin towns – sister cities

Rastatt is twinned with:

 Fano, Italy
 Guarapuava, Brazil
 New Britain, United States
 Orange, France
 Ostrov, Czech Republic
 Woking, England, United Kingdom

Notable people

Herman Fortunatus (1595–1665), Margrave of Baden-Rodemachern
Charles William (1627–1666), Margrave of Baden-Rodemachern
Augustus George (1706–1771), Margrave of Baden-Baden
Joseph Frank (1771–1842), physician
Wilhelm Stemmermann (1888–1944), general in the Wehrmacht
Luise Adolpha Le Beau (1850–1927), pianist and composer
Bodo Uhse (1904–1963), writer
Oliver Hassencamp (1921–1988), cabaret artist, actor and author
Ricky King (born 1946), musician
Joachim Schuster (born 1962), politician (SDP)
Christian Seifert (born 1969), football functionary
Andria Lloyd (born 1971), Jamaican sprinter, Olympic medalist
Philipp Laux (born 1973), footballer

In literature
The plot of the historical novel The Lenz Papers by Stefan Heym (published London 1964) is set in 1849 Rastatt, during the failed revolutions in Germany in 1848.

Gallery

References

Further reading

External links

Official website
Rastatt pictures

Rastatt (district)
Baden